Oreochromis esculentus, the Singida tilapia or Graham's tilapia, is a  species of cichlid endemic to the Lake Victoria basin, including some of its satellite lakes such as Kyoga, in Tanzania, Uganda, and Kenya. Its common name refers to Lake Singida, but this population is the result of an introduction that happened in the 1950s. This fish is highly valued by local fishermen, who know it as ngege.

In 1927-1928 Michael Graham conducted the first ever systematic Fisheries Survey of Lake Victoria. In his official report of the expedition, Graham wrote that "The ngege or satu Tilapia esculenta, is the most important food fish of the lake, whether for native or non-native consumption. No other fish equals it in the quality of the flesh. It is convenient size for trade, travels well and is found in much greater numbers than other important fish, such as semutundu (Luganda), Bagrus sp.''''. Furthermore, Graham noted that "The introduction of the European flax gill-net of 5 inch mesh has undoubtedly caused a diminution in the number of ngege in those parts of the Kavirondo Gulf, the northern shore of the lake, the Sesse Islands and Smith's Sound which are conveniently situated to markets".Oreochromis esculentus has been introduced into the Pangani River basin, where it presents a threat to the native relative O. jipe.

Description

Conservation
Due to the introduced predatory Nile perch (Lates niloticus) and the highly competitive Nile tilapia (Oreochromis niloticus''), with the main population in Lake Victoria itself having declined by more than 80% in the last 20 years. In addition to the threat from the introduced species, the remaining populations are also under heavy fishing pressure, leading to the evaluation of this species as near threatened.

References

External links
 

esculentus
Fish of Lake Victoria
Critically endangered fish
Critically endangered fauna of Africa
Fish described in 1928
Taxonomy articles created by Polbot